Oryxa is a genus of planthoppers in the hemipteran family Flatidae. They live on the islands of Borneo and Sumatra, and in Malaysia.

The genus was established in 1902 by Leopold Melichar in his monograph of the families Acanaloniidae and Flatidae. Melichar designated Carl Linnaeus' O. truncata to be the type species of his new genus, but Melichar's specimens were not of the species described by Linnaeus. A replacement name of Oryxa melichari was therefore chosen for Melichar's species; the status of Linnaeus' species remains unclear.

Species
Fulgoromorpha Lists on the Web includes:
 Oryxa carinulata (Schmidt, 1904)
 Oryxa extendens Melichar, 1902
 Oryxa melichari Kirkaldy, 1913

References

External links

Insects of Malaysia
Flatidae
Auchenorrhyncha genera